Leighton Hill is a hill between Causeway Bay and Happy Valley, and the south of Leighton Road, Hong Kong. There were several air-raid shelters at the downhill of Leighton Hill to protect Victoria City from Japanese occupation during the Battle of Hong Kong in World War II. In 2002, a private housing estate with the same name The Leighton Hill is built.

Others
The Leighton Hill

References

Places in Hong Kong
Happy Valley, Hong Kong
Mountains, peaks and hills of Hong Kong